Hamilton Township, one of the eleven townships of Warren County, Ohio, United States, is in the south central portion of the county. The 2000 census found 9,630 people there, up significantly from the 5,900 in 1990. 8,645 of the total in 2000 lived in the unincorporated portions of the township.  It is the fastest growing area of Warren County and is about 36 miles² (93 km) in area.

Geography
Located in the southern part of the county, it borders the following townships:
Union Township - north
Salem Township - northeast
Harlan Township - east
Goshen Township, Clermont County - southeast
Miami Township, Clermont County - southwest, south of Symmes Township
Symmes Township, Hamilton County - southwest, north of Miami Township
Deerfield Township - west

The village of Maineville is near the center of the township. Parts of the township have been annexed by South Lebanon in the north and Loveland in the south. The communities of Zoar, Cozaddale, Murdock, Hopkinsville, Dallasburg, and Fosters are located here.

History
Hamilton Township was one of the four original townships of Warren County, created on May 10, 1803. It is named for Alexander Hamilton, as are similar townships, in Franklin, Jackson, and Lawrence counties statewide.

Government
The township is governed by a three-member board of trustees, who are elected in November of odd-numbered years to a four-year term beginning on the following January 1. Two are elected in the year after the presidential election and one is elected in the year before it. There is also an elected township fiscal officer, who serves a four-year term beginning on April 1 of the year after the election, which is held in November of the year before the presidential election. Vacancies in the fiscal officership or on the board of trustees are filled by the remaining trustees.

Public services
Most of the township is in the Little Miami Local School District, but parts are in the Loveland City, Kings Local, and Goshen Local School Districts. The township is primarily served by the Little Miami and South Lebanon telephone exchanges, but parts lie in the Morrow and Butlerville exchanges. Mail is delivered through the Maineville, Loveland, Goshen, South Lebanon, and Morrow post offices.

Transportation
The major roads are US Route 22/Ohio 3, also known as the 3C Highway and originally known as the Cincinnati, Montgomery, and Hopkinsville pike. The Marietta and Cincinnati Railroad, which was absorbed by the Baltimore and Ohio Railroad, ran through the southeast corner of the township, while the Little Miami Railroad  (acquired by he Pennsylvania Railroad) followed the Little Miami River through the township. (This is now the Little Miami Bike Trail.)

References

External links
Township website
County website

Townships in Warren County, Ohio
1803 establishments in Ohio
Populated places established in 1803
Townships in Ohio